North Carolina Highway 306 (NC 306) is a primary state highway in the U.S. state of North Carolina. The highway provides a link between Havelock, Minnesott Beach, and Grantsboro. The route is primarily rural, and uses two free ferries to cross the Neuse and Pamlico Rivers before reaching NC 92/NC 99 near Gaylord.

NC 306 was established in 1932 as a new primary route running from Minnesott Beach to NC 302 in Grantsboro. The highway was extended north to NC 33 near Aurora in 1936. The highway remained unchanged until 1976, when the northern and southern termini of the highway were extended to their current locations.

Route description
The highway's southern terminus is in Craven County, near Havelock. It follows Ferry Road north from its intersection with NC 101 for about  before it encounters the Neuse River. On the banks of the river is the dock for a free ferry, which the highway utilizes to cross the river. Many locals use this ferry to commute to and from the Marine Corps Air Station Cherry Point in Havelock, which makes this particular crossing among the busiest in the state.

Once across the river, which serves as the county line for Pamlico County, the highway goes through the village of Minnesott Beach. The route goes due north through Pamlico County on the east bank of the river. In Grantsboro, it crosses NC 55 about halfway through the county before crossing into Beaufort County. Many from southern Craven and Carteret counties use this route to get to the popular destination of Oriental.

Once in Beaufort County, a brief concurrency with NC 33 begins about  into the county. NC 306 then turns left from the NC 33, skirting Aurora and bisecting the large PCS Phosphate facilities. After going through PCS Phosphate, the road crosses the Pamlico River, again by a free ferry used by many commuters to get to the phosphate plant. On the other side of the river, the route immediately and abruptly comes to its northern terminus at NC 92 and NC 99, still in Beaufort County.

History
NC 306 was established in 1930 as a new primary routing from Minnesott Beach to NC 302 (present-day NC 55) in Grantsboro. In 1932, NC 306 was extended north on new primary routing to NC 33 near Aurora.

In 1976, NC 306 was extended on both directions. The northern extension overlaps with NC 33 to Aurora, where it then goes north on new primary routing to the Pamlico River Ferry where it crosses the Pamlico River to Gaylord, ending at NC 92. The southern extension begins at Minnesott Beach, where it goes on the Neuse River Ferry, crossing the Neuse River to Cherry Point, then continuing south on new primary routing to NC 101. In 2001, the routing between Aurora and the Pamlico River Ferry was adjusted related to expansion at the nearby PCS Phosphate site.

Future
NCDOT has identified the need to replace the current ferry service across the Pamlico River with a  two-lane bridge. The justification is to accommodate current existing and future commuter and commercial traffic growth related to the PCS Phosphate site. At an estimated cost of $101 million, it is currently unfunded.

Junction list

See also
North Carolina Bicycle Route 3-Concurrent with NC 306 from Tunstall Swamp Road (near the southern intersection with NC 33) to the Bayview-Aurora Ferry
North Carolina Bicycle Route 7-Concurrent with NC 306 from its southern terminus to Neuse Road in Arapahoe

References

External links

NCRoads.com: N.C. 306

306
Transportation in Craven County, North Carolina
Transportation in Pamlico County, North Carolina
Transportation in Beaufort County, North Carolina